Daniela Santiago Villena (Málaga, April 1, 1982) is a Spanish model and actress, known for playing Cristina "La Veneno" in the biopic series Veneno (2020), for which she was awarded an Ondas Award.

Biography 
Daniela Santiago Villena was born on April 1, 1982 in Málaga, España. Shortly before she turned 18, she settled in Madrid and began her career as a model. Later, she lived in Malaga, working as a professional makeup artist until a friend encouraged her to apply for the casting of the series about La Veneno.

Her first television job was a leading role in Veneno, an Atresmedia series created by Javier Ambrossi and Javier Calvo about the life of "La Veneno". She found out about the casting call for this television project through a friend in Barcelona. She was discovered in the casting opened by Eva Leira and Yolanda Serrano, who selected her for the great physical resemblance she had with "La Veneno" at the time she became famous in the program Esta noche cruzamos el Mississippi on Telecinco. In the series, she played Cristina in the middle years of her life, sharing the starring role with actresses Jedet and Isabel Torres. For this television role, she received the Ondas 2020 Award in the category of best female performer in national fiction, as well as a nomination for best leading actress in a series at the Feroz Awards and another for best female performance in a series at the Forqué Awards. Subsequently, she participated in two episodes of the series ByAnaMilán.

In support of trans visibility, she starred in the short film Julia, written and directed by Miguel Ángel Olivares, in January 2021. In April of the same year, it was announced that she was cast in Madres paralelas, directed by Pedro Almodóvar, which was released in theaters in September of the same year.

In 2022, she participated as a guest in an episode of the second season of Drag Race España. In the same year, she participated in the talent show Masterchef Celebrity 7.

Filmography

Cinema

Television

Television series

Television programs

Awards and nominations

References 

Spanish female dancers
Transgender actresses
Spanish female models
LGBT models
Spanish television actresses
21st-century Spanish actresses
Living people
1982 births